The Thaon di Revel class (also known as PPA for 'Pattugliatore Polivalente d'Altura - Multipurpose Offshore Patrol Vessel') is a class of multipurpose offshore ships built by Fincantieri for the Italian Navy.
It is planned to replace four Soldati-class light patrol frigates and eight s between 2021/2035. As part of the 2014 Naval Law, a total of sixteen ships are planned and as of 2019 seven vessels have been financed with three more on option.

The class, designed with a high level of modularity and automation, will be delivered in a full, a light+ and a light configuration in terms of different sensors and equipments embarked and can perform multiple functions, ranging from patrol with sea rescue capacity to civil protection operations and, in its most highly equipped version, first line fighting vessel.

According to RID, the Italian Navy ordered the new MBDA TESEO MK/2E heavy-duty missile (TESEO "EVO"), a long-range anti-ship missile with also strategic land attack capability. The missile will have a new terminal "head" with dual RF seeker (Radio Frequency) and, presumably, date the need to even attack ground targets, IIR (Imaging IR). Compared to the predecessor OTOMAT/TESEO, the TESEO "EVO" MK/2E has a double range or more than 360 km. Former OTOMAT is accredited for a range of action of more than 180 km.

The Light configuration has only gun armament. The Light+ and Full options also mount Aster anti-aircraft missiles and torpedoes. All configuration have the option to mount TESEO "EVO" MK2/E anti-ship missile launchers.

During the launching ceremony of Marcantonio Colonna on 26 November 2022, Chief of Staff of the Italian Navy Admiral Enrico Credendino announced that the two 'Light' configuration ships - Paolo Thaon di Revel and Francesco Morosini - would be refit into the 'Full' configuration. Thus the class would feature a total of four 'Full' ships and three 'Light+'.

Ships 
Italics indicate estimated dates

Potential Exports 

Italy's latest proposal for the Hellenic navy contains 4 Doha-class corvettes, a type designed for the Qatari Emiri navy, and 2 Thaon di Revel class multipurpose offshore ships. As of June 2022, the Hellenic navy′s focus seems to be on the Gowind-class (French proposal) and the Doha-class (Italian proposal).

References

External links 
 Pattugliatore Polivalente di Altura Marina Militare website

Ships built by Fincantieri
Frigate classes
Frigates of the Italian Navy
Patrol ship classes
Patrol vessels of the Italian Navy
Ships built in La Spezia
Proposed ships